Cobain On Cobain: Interviews And Encounters is a book by author and writer Nicholas Soulsby. It was published in February 2016, and tells the tale of the band Nirvana entirely and only through the words of front-man Kurt Cobain and those of his band-mates through their five-year career. The interviews start from the release of their first album Bleach to the band's collapse on their 1994 European tour followed shortly by Cobain's suicide. The book also includes interviews that have never been seen in print before.

Release
Upon release, Soulsby did some brief press for the book in the United Kingdom.

Reception
Reception of the book was positive. Charles Cross, writing for The Seattle Times had said that "Cobain on Cobain is sure to interest die-hard fans.

Gillian Gaar, had also reviewed Cobain On Cobain and stated that "This fascinating collection offers you a front-row seat to Nirvana's stunning rise and tragic fall. Before the biographies, before the revisionism, before the mythologies, Nirvana's story is revealed by Cobain and his bandmates as it unfolds, without the benefit of hindsight. Cobain on Cobain is the closest you can get to a Kurt Cobain autobiography."

References

2016 non-fiction books
Cultural depictions of Kurt Cobain
Works about music and musicians